Bob Bryant (August 11, 1944 – February 25, 2016) was an American politician.

Born in Savannah, Georgia, Bryant served in the United States Army and served in South Vietnam. He received his bachelor's degree in business administration from Columbia College. Bryant worked for the city of Savannah and for WEAS-FM radio station. He also worked for a law firm and car dealership as the general manager. Bryant lived in Garden City, Georgia. He was a member of the Georgia House of Representatives from the 162nd District, serving from 2005 until his death. He was a member of the Democratic party. He died at a hospital in Savannah, Georgia, back in 2016, after sustaining a fall.

References

1944 births
2016 deaths
Democratic Party members of the Georgia House of Representatives
Politicians from Savannah, Georgia
Businesspeople from Georgia (U.S. state)
21st-century American politicians
African-American state legislators in Georgia (U.S. state)
20th-century American businesspeople
20th-century African-American people
21st-century African-American politicians